The England cricket team toured Australia during the 2010–11 season from 25 November 2010 to 6 February 2011. The series comprised the traditional five Tests for The Ashes, and also featured seven ODIs and two Twenty20s. The Umpire Decision Review System was used for the ODI series.

England won the Ashes 3–1, making it the first time in 24 years that they had won the Ashes in Australia.

First-class matches

Tour matches

England v Western Australia

England v South Australia

England v Australia A

England v Victoria

Ashes Test series

The 2010–11 Ashes series took place from 25 November 2010 to 7 January 2011. Five Tests were played at grounds in Brisbane, Adelaide, Perth, Melbourne and Sydney. England won the series 3–1.

Limited overs matches

Tour match

T20I series

Squads

Following the defeat in the 2010–11 Ashes series, Michael Clarke announced his retirement from Twenty20, to focus on Test and 50-over cricket. Cameron White will take over as captain, with Tim Paine as vice-captain.

1st T20I

Prior to the start of the match, a minute's silence was held for victims of the recent flooding in Queensland. Both teams donated part of their match fees to help the victims and £18,000 (A$28,450) was collected from people in the ground. England's victory was their eighth consecutive win, setting a world record for most consecutive wins in Twenty20 Internationals.

2nd T20I

ODI series

Squads

1st ODI

Shane Watson's score of 161 not out was the fifth-highest ODI score by an Australian. The Australian total was the highest successful run chase in ODI matches played at the MCG.

2nd ODI

3rd ODI

4th ODI

5th ODI

6th ODI

England's score of 333 was their highest score against Australia, and the highest ODI total without a six. Australia's score of 334 was their highest ODI score when batting second. This was also the highest successful run chase at the SCG by Australia.

7th ODI

References

External links
Series site at Cricinfo.com
English cricket team in Australia in 2010–11 at BBC Sport

2010 in English cricket
2011 in English cricket
England 2010-11
2010-11
2010-11
International cricket competitions in 2010–11